Carlyle Carrol Tapsell (July 24, 1909 – September 6, 1975) was an Indian field hockey player who competed in the 1932 Summer Olympics and 1936 Summer Olympics. In 1932 he was a member of the Indian field hockey team, which won the gold medal. He played two matches as back. Four years later he was again a member of the Indian field hockey team, which won the gold medal. He played four matches as back. He was born in Adra, India. He studied in St. George's College, Mussoorie, India, which produced six Olympic hockey player (Earnest and William Goodsir-Cullen, George Marthins, Michael Gateley, Lionel Emmett, and Tapsell).

External links
 
 profile at databaseOlympics
 profile at Sports Reference

1909 births
1975 deaths
People from Purulia district
Field hockey players from West Bengal
Olympic field hockey players of India
Field hockey players at the 1932 Summer Olympics
Field hockey players at the 1936 Summer Olympics
Indian male field hockey players
Olympic gold medalists for India
Anglo-Indian people
Olympic medalists in field hockey
Medalists at the 1936 Summer Olympics
Medalists at the 1932 Summer Olympics
Indian emigrants to Australia
Australian people of Anglo-Indian descent